Ashford International railway station is a National Rail station in Ashford, Kent, England. It connects several railway lines, including High Speed 1 and the South Eastern Main Line. Services are operated by Southeastern and Southern.

The station opened in 1842 as Ashford by the South Eastern Railway (SER) as a temporary terminus of the line from London to Dover via Croydon. Connections to Folkestone, Canterbury and Hastings opened within ten years. It was renamed Ashford (Kent) in 1923. There have been two significant rebuilds; in the 1960s for the South Eastern Main Line electrification, and to accommodate international services in the 1990s. The station was renamed as Ashford International in 1996. Domestic services along High Speed 1 to St Pancras have been running since 2009.

Location and services

The station is to the southeast of the town centre at the convergence of several important lines. While all tracks are electrified with 750 V DC third rail, platforms 3 to 6 are also electrified with 25 kV 50 Hz AC overhead lines.

The station has six platforms. Eurostar trains have previously used platforms 3 and 4, while domestic trains use the original platforms 1 and 2, and a new island platform (numbered 5 and 6) built by British Rail when the Channel Tunnel opened. The Eurostar platforms have bilingual signs, in both French and English. The domestic terminal to the north of the tracks and the international terminal to the south are connected by a subway which has access to the platforms; access to the international trains on platforms 3 and 4 is only possible through an overbridge from the international terminal. The local bus stops and taxi ranks are at the entrance to the domestic terminal.

There are ticket office windows in the domestic booking hall, as well as ticket vending machines. There has been a domestic ticket office window in the Eurostar station, staffed during morning peak only. The international ticket counter in the Eurostar station was only staffed for part of the day. The international terminal is connected to a multi-storey car park by a footbridge, while other parking facilities are adjacent to the domestic entrance.

History

South Eastern Railway

The station was built by the South Eastern Railway (SER) and planned during the initial Railway Mania as a stop between Croydon and Dover. A special train from  ran on 28 November 1842, and the station formally opened on 1 December, along with the rest of the line from Redhill. The journey from London to Ashford could now be made in three and a half hours. A more direct route was ruled out by Parliament, who felt that more than one railway south of London was undesirable.

The original station consisted of two platforms with two through lines, along with wooden buildings. The line ended at Ashford until the extension to Folkestone opened on 28 June 1843. A connection to Canterbury West was authorised on 23 May 1844, and opened on 6 February 1846. The Marshlink line connection to Hastings opened on 13 February 1851, after several false starts owing to problems with constructing the line and rivalry with other lines. The station became known sometimes as Ashford Junction.

The Ashford railway works was established in 1847, on a site to the east of the station and the River Stour. The first locomotive, known as the "Coffee Pot" for its unusual vertical boiler, was designed there the following year and constructed in 1850. It remained in service until 1861. The works led to the creation of Alfred Town, later known at New Town which is now an Ashford suburb.

Another station, was opened by the rival London, Chatham & Dover Railway (LCDR) on 1 July 1884 for services via Maidstone East to London. It was based to the southwest of the town centre, adjacent to the cattle market. A link from the LCDR line to the SER station opened on 1 November 1891.

South Eastern and Chatham Railway
On 1 January 1899, as part of the formation of the South Eastern and Chatham Railway (SECR), passenger services were diverted to the former SER station and Ashford West closed. At the same time, the track was modified to give six separate approaches into the station, so that trains could pull up simultaneously. The complete Ashford West station, including buildings and platforms, were converted into a works for cleaning cloths used in locomotive cleaning. Over a million were processed annually, with the reclaimed oil being re-used in the lubrication of points and point rodding. The platform canopies survived to the 1930s, while the station site was largely intact as of 1985, with the main station building still standing in 1994. The station buildings were demolished in 1999 for the construction of High Speed 1.

In November 1904, the SECR agreed to a £47,000 rebuilding of the scheme in order to accommodate Maidstone traffic, which included removing a cattle dock so trains would not have to run on part of the South Eastern Main Line. The work was completed in 1907. Further resignalling work continued into the next year.

Southern Railway
The station became part of the Southern Railway (SR) during the grouping of 1923. It was renamed to Ashford (Kent) on 9 July to avoid confusion with Ashford (Middlesex) railway station. Steam locomotive construction was discontinued in 1936, though repair work continued to take place.

British Rail

The station passed on to the Southern Region of British Railways on nationalisation in 1948. It was rebuilt in the early 1960s as part of the "Kent Coast Electrification – Stage 2" stage of the British Railways Modernisation Plan to accommodate electrification of most lines entering the station. Electric services began to be used on the South Eastern Main Line on 12 June 1961, and on the Maidstone line on 9 October. The two bay platforms were demolished and replaced by two island platforms. This required the demolition and rebuilding of the Station Road / Beaver Road bridge immediately to the west. Ashford's four signal boxes were replaced by a single control centre on 29 April 1962. The main station buildings on either side of the line were replaced between 1963 and 1966 by a footbridge including a booking hall, newsagent and catering facilities. The new scheme was the design of the Southern Region Architect, Nigel Wikeley. Although most of the original station was demolished during this rebuild, two substantial platform canopies dating from the SECR era were retained, although the original wooden valences were covered by asbestos. At the same time, the mechanical signalling system, consisting of five lever-operated boxes, was replaced with an all-electric system, coming into service on 29 April 1962.

When sectorisation was introduced in the 1980s by British Rail, the station was served by Network SouthEast  until privatisation. In 1984, the track layout at the station was simplified, restricting the Maidstone and Canterbury West connections to the north of the track layout, and the Marshlink line to the south.

International station

The station was rebuilt as Ashford International to serve trains to mainland Europe. Construction was planned to begin in 1991 but delayed owing to a lack of government approval. It was planned as a partial park and ride side, catering for up to 2,000 vehicles, and as a means of regenerating the town. Work started on the rebuilding in June 1994 and continued for 18 months. The project was designed by the British Rail Architecture and Design Group, and was inspired by the Maison de Verre, Paris. Two new platforms were built to the north of the station, with the original down island platform taken over by international services. The total cost of the work was £80 million.

To segregate passengers from domestic and international services, a dedicated entrance from the ticket barrier to the platforms was built. This included a separate departure lounge that could accommodate up to 800 passengers. A multistorey car park was built, connecting to the international end of the station via a footbridge.

The rebuilt station opened for international services on 8 January 1996, with the first stop being the 06:19 service from Waterloo. The station was formally renamed Ashford International on 28 February. When phase 1 of the Channel Tunnel Rail Link was completed in 2003, a dedicated fast line was built allowing through trains to bypass the station via a  tunnel and a  viaduct.

Before the completion of High Speed 1 in November 2007, twelve Eurostar trains a day called at Ashford, seven heading to Paris and five to Brussels. However, after the opening of Ebbsfleet International, this was reduced to three trains to/from Paris, and a daily service to Disneyland Paris. Eurostar defended the reduction, saying stopping at Ashford International added 8 minutes to journey times and required 25 people joining the train there to make it economically viable. A petition to reinstate services gathered 11,000 signatures. A single direct train in each direction to Brussels was reinstated in 2009, following campaigning from Kent County Council and Ashford Borough Council. This was expanded the following year to allow direct services between Ashford, Lille and Brussels-South on weekends, making day trips to European cities from Ashford possible. In May 2015, a service to Marseille via Lyon and Avignon began running up to five times a week. 

In 2018, it was announced that the international platforms would undergo a £10m refurbishment to make them compatible with Eurostar's  units, branded as Eurostar e320, as well as to allow other operators to use the station. The first Eurostar e320 stopped at Ashford on 3 April, with the Secretary of State for Transport, Chris Grayling, and the MP for Ashford, Damian Green, on board. No other e320s stopped at Ashford International because of a technical fault until January 2020.

In September 2020, Eurostar announced that due to the ongoing COVID-19 pandemic and subsequent collapse in ticket revenue (down by 90%), both Ebbsfleet and Ashford International stations would not be served by Eurostar services until at least 2022. In September 2021, Eurostar confirmed that services would not resume until 2023, despite complaints by local politicians that this was "bad for Kent". Eurostar stated that they will resume services when commercially sensible to do so, as they will initially "focus on destinations where demand is highest". A further update in August 2022 confirmed that the station (along with Ebbsfleet International) would likely not open until at least 2025. Additional processing work caused by Brexit has also contributed to suspension of services.

Domestic services 
In 2007, a new maintenance depot, operated by Hitachi, opened to the northeast of the station, alongside the Canterbury West branch. A test train running at up to  covered the distance between Ashford International and St Pancras in 29 minutes. A full service began in December 2009, which has allowed Ashford to become a commuter town for London.

Southern
In May 2018, Southern announced the direct service from Ashford International to Brighton via Eastbourne would be discontinued. The company wanted to cancel the service for some time, as it would allow them to add additional capacity between Eastbourne and Hastings, but had repeatedly faced objections from councillors along the line, including at Lewes.

Future
Because Ashford International connects High Speed 1 to the Marshlink line, it creates potential for a fast service from St Pancras to Hastings and Eastbourne. In November 2017, the Secretary of State for Transport, Chris Grayling, proposed a modification of the track layout at Ashford International to accommodate such a service. The scheme was supported by Amber Rudd, a former Hastings MP.

To connect the two lines, the junction at the west end of the station would need to be rebuilt, with 25 kV 50 Hz AC overhead wires being installed along platform 2. This would relieve pressure from platforms 5 and 6, which currently handle all High Speed 1 domestic services. In 2018, a spokesman for Network Rail said remodelling the station could be complete by 2022.

Services

Domestic

There are three main routes from Ashford International to London. The twice-hourly High Speed 1 domestic service has been running since 13 December 2009, and provides the quickest service to Central London via St Pancras in 37 minutes, which is at least twice as fast as any other route. A 25% premium is added to High Speed tickets. The other two routes to London are the South Eastern Main Line to Charing Cross and the Maidstone line to Victoria via Maidstone East.

As of December 2019, the typical off peak service in trains per hour is:

Southeastern
 2 tph to London St Pancras International
 2 tph to London Charing Cross via 
 1 tph to  via 
 1 tph to Ramsgate via  (all stations)
 1 tph to  via Canterbury West (semi-fast)

Southeastern services at Ashford International are operated using ,  and  EMUs.Southern 1 tph to  via 
Southern services at Ashford International are operated using  DMUs.

International

As of July 2020, the off-peak timetable was:
 3 tpd to Paris – Gare du Nord
 1 tpd to Brussels South 
 1 tpd to Marne-la-Vallée – Chessy (Disneyland Paris) 
 Up to 3 tpw to Marseille – Saint-Charles via Lyon and Avignon – seasonal service from May to September
 Up to 3 tpw to Bourg-Saint-Maurice in the French Alps – seasonal service from December to April
Direct Eurostar services from St Pancras to  did not stop at Ashford, though a connection can be made by changing at Brussels.

Incidents
The first fatality on the South Eastern Railway occurred at Ashford in May 1843. A guard had stepped onto a running board to look for lost luggage, when the train suddenly started. He was decapitated when his head hit a sentry box.

See also
Ashford Steam Centre
Ashford train depot

Notes

ReferencesCitationsSources'''

External links

 

 
 BVE Trainsim simulation from Ashford to Swanley 

International
Railway stations in Kent
DfT Category B stations
Former South Eastern Railway (UK) stations
Railway stations in Great Britain opened in 1842
Railway stations served by Govia Thameslink Railway
Railway stations served by Southeastern
Railway stations in Great Britain served by Eurostar
1842 establishments in England
Train driver depots in England
UK railway stations with juxtaposed controls